Oboqs or Oboks were Mongolian clan councils, the next step up from a family. The oboq leader, or Batur, was supreme during times of war but mainly kept out of family business during peacetime, unless summoned to solve a problem. The batur was chosen based on prowess in war and administrative ability; not on seniority and kinship.  The oboq councils organized raids, migrations, and hunts.  The oboq was also the court for petty crimes, such as stealing or sexual assault.  Higher up was the khan, or leader of the tribe as a whole.  During Genghis Khan's reign, the oboq system was reformed to create a "decimal" system.  Arbans, a group of 10 parental groups which were replaced by the oboqs.  10 arbans went in a jaghun, and 10 jaghuns created a minghan, essentially a new tribe.  Mostly Genghis Khan created minghans based on former relationships, but sometimes they were created with members of many different "rebellious" tribes.

References

Oboq